Superbird-C, also known as Superbird-3  or Superbird-A3, was a geostationary communications satellite ordered and operated by Space Communications Corporation (SCC) that was designed and manufactured by Hughes Space and Communications Company (now Boeing Satellite Systems) on the HS-601 satellite bus. It has a pure Ku-band payload and was used fill the position at 144° East longitude. It provided television signals and business communications services throughout Japan, South Asia, East Asia, and Hawaii.

Satellite description 
The spacecraft was designed and manufactured by then Hughes Space and Communications Company (now Boeing Satellite Development Center) on the HS-601 satellite bus. When stowed for launch, it measured . It had two wings with four solar panels each, that generated 4.5 kW at the end of its design life. It had a 29-cell NiH2 battery with a power charge of 200 Ah.

It also used had 12  bipropellant thrusters for station keeping and attitude control. It included enough propellant for orbit circularization and 13 years of operation.

Its payload is composed of two  dual-gridded reflectors and twenty four Ku-band transponders powered by a traveling-wave-tube amplifier (TWTA) with and output power of 90 watts. It can configure two 54 MHz transponders into one 114 MHz with an effective 180 watts.

The Ku-band footprint covered Japan, southern and eastern Asia, and Hawaii.

History 
Space Communications Corporation (SCC) was founded in 1985, the same year as the original companies that later formed JSAT. SCC switched satellite suppliers and on 1995 ordered a satellite from Boeing, Superbird-C.

On 28 July 1997 at 01:15:01 UTC, Superbird-C was put into orbit by an Atlas IIAS launched from Cape Canaveral LC-36B.

Superbird-C was replaced by Superbird-C2 during 2008, in 2015 it was decommissioned.

References 

Communications satellites in geostationary orbit
Satellites using the BSS-601 bus
Spacecraft launched in 1997
Communications satellites of Japan
1997 in Japan